Producers Guild Film Award for Best Actress in a Drama Series is an award given by Apsara Producers Guild to recognize excellence in film and television, to recognize a male actor in television drama series who has delivered an outstanding performance in a leading role.

The award was first awarded in 2003 under the title Best Actress in a Drama Series and is awarded every year annually thereafter.

Superlatives

Multiple winners
 2 Wins: Sakshi Tanwar, Ankita Lokhande
 1 Win: Mona Singh, Niki Aneja Walia, Tina Datta, Ragini Khanna, Drashti Dhami, Deepika Singh

Multiple nominations
 3 Nominations: Sakshi Tanwar, Ankita Lokhande
 2 Nominations: Niki Aneja Walia, Rashami Desai, Divyanka Tripathi, Deepika Singh

Winners

References

External links
 Official Website: Producers Guild Film Awards

Producers Guild Film Awards
Television awards for Best Actress